Kathleen Brady (born c. 1946) is an American historian, author and essayist.

Education 
In 1968 Kathleen Brady graduated from St. Bonaventure University, majoring in journalism, with minors in history and philosophy. She earned a master's degree in urban affairs from Hunter College in 2006.

Career and critical reception 
Brady has written books about Lucille Ball, Francis of Assisi and Clare of Assisi, and Ida Tarbell. She also wrote an essay about Hazel Brannon Smith. She was a reporter for TIME and wrote columns for other publications. She worked as a Senior Writer in a Communications Department in New York City.

Reviews 
Reviews of Ida Tarbell: Portrait of a Muckraker :

Review of Lucille: The Life of Lucille Ball:

Review of Francis and Clare: The Struggles of the Saints of Assisi:

Selected publications

Books

Essays 

 Kathleen Brady, "Hazel Brannon Smith: White Martyr for Civil Rights," in Forgotten Heroes, edited by Susan Ware, New York: The Free Press, 1998.

Awards, honors
In March 2022, Brady was named the Lenna Endowed Visiting Professor, sponsored by St. Bonaventure University and Jamestown Community College
Brady was named a Fellow of the Society of American Historians for Ida Bell: Portrait of a Muckraker.

References

Year of birth missing (living people)
Living people
St. Bonaventure University alumni
21st-century American women writers
Hunter College alumni
American women historians
21st-century American historians
Time (magazine) people